Imogen Edwards-Jones (born June 1968, in Birmingham), is a British writer, author and journalist, who blogs for doyoutravel.com and Get the Gloss.

Biography
Edwards-Jones was educated at Malvern Girls' College, a boarding independent school in the spa town of Malvern in Worcestershire, which merged with another school in 2006 to form Malvern St James School, followed by the University of Bristol, where she gained a degree in Russian, and then City University London.

Edwards-Jones is best known for the Babylon series of exposés based on her 2004 novel,  Hotel Babylon from an insider's view of the non-stop world of the hotel staff and guests alike.

In 2006, Edwards-Jones had a regular column in The Daily Telegraph, detailing her attempts at IVF which resulted in the birth of her daughter. She blogs for doyoutravel.com and Get the Gloss.

Edwards-Jones is married to the BBC's Creative Head of Comedy Talent, Kenton Allen. Candace Bushnell is her daughter's godmother.

Works

Babylon series

 Hotel Babylon (2004, with "anonymous",  see also BBC series Hotel Babylon based on this book)
 Air Babylon (2005, with "anonymous", in development by Carnival Films for television)
 Fashion Babylon (2006, with "anonymous",  see also BBC series Material Girl loosely based on this book)
 Beach Babylon (2007, with "anonymous")
 Pop Babylon (2008, with "anonymous")
 Wedding Babylon (2009, with "anonymous")
 Hospital Babylon (2011, with "anonymous")
 Restaurant Babylon (2012, with "anonymous")

Other books
 The Taming of Eagles: Exploring the New Russia (1993) (with Joth Shakerley)
 My Canapé Hell (2000)
 Big Night Out (2002) (with Jessica Adams, Maggie Alderson and Nick Earls)
 Shagpile (2002)
 The Wendy House (2003)
 Tuscany for Beginners (2004)
 Ladies' Night (2005) (with Jessica Adams, Maggie Alderson and Chris Manby) 
 The Stork Club (2006)
 In Bed With... (co-edited with Kathy Lette, 2009, with Jessica Adams, Maggie Alderson, et al.)
  The Witches of St Petersburg (2018)

References

1968 births
Living people
Alumni of City, University of London
Alumni of the University of Bristol
People educated at Malvern St James
21st-century British novelists
21st-century British non-fiction writers
21st-century British women writers
British women novelists
British women non-fiction writers